Philanthus coronatus is a species of bee-hunting wasp (or "beewolf") of Europe and the Middle East, of which there are three known subspecies:

P. coronatus coronatus Thunberg, 1784 (type-subspecies)
P. coronatus ibericus Beaumont, 1970
P. coronatus orientalis Bytinski-Salz, 1959

References

Crabronidae
Hymenoptera of Europe
Insects described in 1784